Marquise Damond Blair (born July 18, 1997) is an American football safety for the Philadelphia Eagles of the National Football League (NFL). He played college football at Utah.

Early years
Blair attended Wooster High School in Wooster, Ohio He was a First-team Division II all-state as a senior at Wooster High (Ohio). Also named first-team Division II All-Ohio and Ohio Cardinal Conference Defensive Player of the Year.

College career
Blair attended  Dodge City Community College before transferring to the University of Utah after the 2016 season. he was a first-team junior college All-American selection he had over a 100 tackles, 3 sacks, and 4 interceptions. He was an all-conference pick for Dodge City as a freshman.

The former first-team All-State pick in Ohio eventually worked his way into the starting lineup with the Utes in 2017, starting 6 of 9 games and making over 48 tackles, three for loss, and two pass breakups. before suffering a season-ending injury against UCLA. As a senior, He started in all 14 games with 12 starts in 2018, garnering second-team All-Pac-12 honors along with 17 of his teammates. He finished the year with 59 stops, two for loss, two interceptions, two pass breakups, and a forced fumble.

Professional career

Seattle Seahawks

2019
Blair was drafted by the Seattle Seahawks in the second round, 47th overall, of the 2019 NFL Draft.

2020
Blair started the 2020 NFL season being named the starting nickelback for the Seahawks, switching over from his original position at safety. He started the season by having seven tackles (four solo) in the Seahawks' first game of the season. Blair also generated a forced fumble in the game that was against the Atlanta Falcons and helped the team secure a 38–25 victory at the Mercedes-Benz Stadium.  In the second game of the season against the New England Patriots, Blair had to step into the role of free safety after starting free safety Quandre Diggs was ejected for a helmet-to-helmet hit during the game. Blair's season was cut short a few plays later when a teammate rolled onto his leg following a tackle resulting in Blair tearing his anterior cruciate ligament. He was placed on injured reserve on September 23.

2021
Blair entered the 2021 season as the backup free safety to Quandre Diggs. He played in six games before suffering a knee injury in Week 7. He was placed on injured reserve on November 12, 2021.

On August 30, 2022, Blair was waived by the Seahawks.

Carolina Panthers
On September 5, 2022, Blair signed with the practice squad of the Carolina Panthers. He was promoted to the active roster on November 6, 2022, before being released the following day.

Philadelphia Eagles
On November 16, 2022, Blair signed with the Philadelphia Eagles practice squad. He was released on December 13.

On February 9, 2023, Blair signed a reserve/futures deal with the Eagles.

References

External links
Utah Utes bio

1997 births
Living people
People from Wooster, Ohio
Players of American football from Ohio
American football safeties
Carolina Panthers players
Dodge City Conquistadors football players
Philadelphia Eagles players
Seattle Seahawks players
Utah Utes football players